The 2016–17 season is Angers SCO's second consecutive season in Ligue 1 since promotion from Ligue 2 in 2015. They are participating in the Ligue 1, the Coupe de France, and the Coupe de la Ligue.

Squad
As of 25 January 2017.

Out on loan

Competitions

Ligue 1

League table

Results summary

Results by round

Results

Coupe de France

Coupe de la Ligue

References

Angers SCO
Angers SCO seasons